Mirza Pur is a village in the Pind Dadan Khan Tehsil, Jhelum District, Punjab, Pakistan, about  from the town of Pind Dadan Khan. It has a population of about 4000.

The village is primarily a village of farmers, with the land known for potatoes, wheat, maize, rice, sugarcane and many vegetables and fruits such mangoes and oranges. The main revenue generation crops are wheat, maize and potatoes. It is one of the largest villages of the Dharyala Jalap union council.

Its adjoining villages are Jaiti Pur (situated on the bank of the river Jhelum), Karim Pur and Khotian. There is a government girls' middle school and government primary school for boys in Mirza Pur. There is also a primary school for girls in Karim Pur (the village where Raja Faheem Mustafa s/o Raja abid Ali hailed from) and Khotian.

References

Populated places in Jhelum District